A global cuisine is a cuisine that is practiced around the world. A cuisine is a characteristic style of cooking practices and traditions, often associated with a specific region, country or culture. To become a global cuisine, a local, regional or national cuisine must spread around the world, its food served worldwide. There have been significant improvements and advances during the last century in food preservation, storage, shipping and production, and today many countries, cities and regions have access to their traditional cuisines and many other global cuisines.

Asia

Japan

Japanese cuisine has spread throughout the world, and representative dishes such as sushi and ramen, among others are popular.  In many cases, Japanese food is adapted and reinvented to fit the preferences of the local populace.  For instance, the California roll is a popular dish in the United States that is a modification of the Japanese makizushi, a type of sushi.  In South Korea, both the Japanese curry and the ramen have been imported and popularized primarily in the form of instant food. Tonkatsu and tempura, which are derived from Western food, are now considered and marketed as uniquely Japanese, as well as the Japanese curry, which derived from the Indian curry.

In many countries including the United States, United Kingdom, Philippines, and Brazil, Japanese restaurants have become popular.  Among these countries, Hong Kong, Taiwan, China, Singapore, Thailand and Indonesia are key consumers, according to recent research.

The market of Japanese ingredients is also growing, with brands such as Ajinomoto, Kikkoman, Nissin and  mayonnaise, are establishing production base in other Asian countries, such as China, Thailand and Indonesia.

China

Chinese cuisine has become widespread throughout many other parts of the world — from Asia to the Americas, Australia, Western Europe and Southern Africa. In recent years, connoisseurs of Chinese cuisine have also sprouted in Eastern Europe and South Asia. American Chinese cuisine and Canadian Chinese food are popular examples of local varieties. Local ingredients would be adopted while maintaining the style and preparation technique.

Traditional Chinese cuisines include Anhui, Cantonese, Fujian, Hunan, Jiangsu, Shandong, Sichuan, and Zhejiang, all of which are defined and termed per the respective regions within China where they developed. These regional cuisines are sometimes referred to as the "eight culinary traditions of China." A number of different styles contribute to Chinese cuisine, but perhaps the best known and most influential are the Sichuan, Shandong, Jiangsu and Guangdong cuisines. These styles are distinctive from one another due to factors such as available resources, climate, geography, history, cooking techniques and lifestyle. Many Chinese traditional regional cuisines rely on basic methods of food preservation such as drying, salting, pickling and fermentation.

Thailand

Thai cuisine is becoming increasingly popular in other parts of the world, including North America, Europe, and other parts of Asia. Thai restaurants are becoming more and more common, serving Thai curry and other traditional dishes.

India 

Indian cuisine has contributed to shaping the history of international relations; the spice trade between India and Europe is often cited by historians as the primary catalyst for Europe's Age of Discovery. Spices were bought from India and traded around Europe and Asia. It has also had the created influence on international cuisines, especially those from Southeast Asia, the British Isles and the Caribbean. The use of Indian spices, herbs and vegetable produce have helped shaped the cuisines of many countries around the world.

Indian cuisine consists of the foods and dishes of India (and to some extent neighboring countries), is characterized by the extensive use of various Indian spices and vegetables grown across India, herbs, vegetables and fruits, and is also known for the widespread practice of vegetarianism in Indian society. Indian regional cuisine is primarily categorized at the regional level, but also at provincial levels. Cuisine differences derive from various local cultures, geographical locations (whether a region is close to the sea, desert or the mountains), and economics. Indian cuisine is also seasonal, and utilizes fresh produce.

The cuisine of India is very diverse with each state having an entirely different food platter. The development of these cuisines have been shaped by Hindu and Jain beliefs, in particular vegetarianism which is a common dietary trend in Indian society. There has also been Islamic influence from the years of Mughal and Delhi Sultanate rule, as well as Persian interactions on North Indian and Deccani cuisine. Indian cuisine has been and is still evolving, as a result of the nation's cultural interactions with other societies. Historical incidents such as foreign invasions, trade relations and colonialism have also played an important role in introducing certain food types and eating habits to the country. For instance, potato, a staple of North Indian diet was brought to India by the Portuguese, who also introduced chiles and breadfruit among other things. Spices were bought from India and traded in exchange for rubber and opium from Malacca. It has also influenced other cuisines across the world, especially those from Southeast Asia, the British Isles and the Caribbean.

Europe

France

Georgia

Georgian cuisine includes more than 80 varieties of local cheeses that are often mixed with pastries and local pizza style cheese breads (Khachapuri), is famous for an abundant usage of walnuts in sauces (Satsivi), salads, or other meat dishes (Kharcho), local dumplings like Khinkali, and regional delicacies like Sinori.

Georgia is the birthplace of wine  and its table culture is deeply connected to the philosophical toast making rituals that are passed down from one generation to the next during Supras.

Italy

Italy's cuisine is one of the best-known cuisines in the world. As a Mediterranean cuisine, Italian cuisine makes heavy use of products based on wheat, olives, and grapes, with tomatoes being a distinguishing factor, and values using few but high-quality ingredients.
 Focaccia
 Pasta
 Pizza
 Risotto

North America

United States

American cuisine is a style of food preparation originating from the United States of America. European colonization of the Americas yielded the introduction of a number of ingredients and cooking styles to the latter. The various styles continued expanding well into the 19th and 20th centuries, proportional to the influx of immigrants from many foreign nations; such influx developed a rich diversity in food preparation throughout the country. Native American cuisine includes all food practices of the indigenous peoples of the Americas. Modern-day native peoples retain a rich body of traditional foods, some of which have become iconic of present-day Native American social gatherings.

Mexico

Mexican cuisine has become widespread all over the world.

South America

Oceania

Australia

New Zealand

See also

Cuisines by continent

 List of cuisines
 List of African cuisines
 List of Asian cuisines
 List of cuisines of the Americas
 List of European cuisines
 List of Oceanian cuisines

Related topics

 Conveyor belt sushi
 Culinary arts
 Farmers' market
 Food cart
 Food festival
 Globalization
 Gourmet Museum and Library
 Hamburger
 International English food terms
 List of street foods around the world
 Fusion cuisine
 National dish
 Pâtisserie
 Regional cuisine
 Sandwich
 Sausage
 Street food
 Street market
 Sushi
 Takeaway

References

Further reading
 Albala, Ken (2011). Food Cultures of the World Encyclopedia Greenwood. 
 Zobel, Myron (1962). "Global cuisine: being the unique recipes of the 84 top restaurants of the world." Patron Press.
 California Culinary Academy (2001). In the World Kitchen: Global Cuisine from California Culinary Academy. Bay Books (CA). .
 Cheung, Sidney; Tan, Chee-Beng (2007). Food and Foodways in Asia: Resource, Tradition and Cooking. Routledge. pp. 201–209. 
 MacVeigh, Jeremy (2008). International Cuisine. Delmar Cengage Learning; 1st edition. .
 Nenes, Michael F; Robbins, Joe (2008). International Cuisine. Hoboken, N.J.: Wiley, John & Sons; 1st edition. .
 Scarparto, Rosario (2000). "New global cuisine: the perspective of postmodern gastronomy studies." Royal Melbourne Institute of Technology.

External links

 The Global Gastronomer: Cuisines of the World
 Wikibooks Cookbook

Cuisine